Grzegorz Kołtan (born 15 September 1955) is a Polish sprint canoeist who competed from the mid to late 1970s. He won six medals at the ICF Canoe Sprint World Championships with two golds (K-4 500 m: 1977, K-4 1000 m: 1977), a silver (K-4 1000 m: 1979), and three bronzes (K-4 500 m: 1978; K-4 10000 m: 1974).

Kołtan also competed in two Summer Olympics, earning his best finish of fourth in the K-4 1000 m event at Moscow in 1980.

References

External links
 
 

1955 births
Living people
Polish male canoeists
ICF Canoe Sprint World Championships medalists in kayak
Olympic canoeists of Poland
Canoeists at the 1976 Summer Olympics
Canoeists at the 1980 Summer Olympics
People from Wałcz
Sportspeople from West Pomeranian Voivodeship
20th-century Polish people